Akhtar Mirza was an Indian screenwriter and director for Bollywood films. He won the Filmfare Award for Best Story, for the 1965 film Waqt. He is the father of National Award-winning director Saeed Akhtar Mirza and the commercially successful film-maker Aziz Mirza, who was responsible for launching the career of Shah Rukh Khan.

Filmography

As writer
1989 Salim Langde Pe Mat Ro (script consultant) 
1973 Joshila (screenplay) 
1973 Dhund (story & screenplay) 
1965 Waqt (story / as F.A. Mirza) 
1965 Mohabbat Isko Kahete Hain (written by) 
1957 Ab Dilli Dur Nahin (screenplay / story) 
1957 Naya Daur (screenplay / story) 
1950 Bawre Nain (story)

As director
1965 Mohabbat Isko Kahete Hain

References

External links
 

Hindi-language film directors
Indian male screenwriters
Filmfare Awards winners
Living people
20th-century Indian dramatists and playwrights
Hindi screenwriters
20th-century Indian male writers
Year of birth missing (living people)